Playing Beatie Bow is a popular Australian children's novel, written by Ruth Park and first published on 31 January 1980. It features a time slip in Sydney, Australia.

Plot summary
Lynette Kirk has been a happy child, cheery about her parents and life, until the day her father leaves her and her mother Kathy for another woman. Lynette wants to distance herself from the life they have shared with her father and changes her name to Abigail. 

Abigail goes down to the park with her young next-door neighbours, Natalie and Vincent. She finds the children there playing a game called "Beatie Bow". After becoming very interested in a "Little Furry Girl" who stands there watching them play, Abigail decides to follow her.

When Abigail's mother admits that she has been seeing her father again and would like them all to move to Norway, where he works as an architect, Abigail is furious and goes for a walk to cool off, again encountering the mysterious girl. She follows her back into the 1800s and is tripped up by the Little Furry Girl's father, resulting in a sprained ankle and a bruised head.

Further into the novel the character Granny (Alice Tallisker) tells Abigail that she is "the stranger" and has "the gift". "The gift" comes from a crocheted detail on her dress, which enables her to travel and heal. The book later suggests that Granny will complete the crochet.

Abigail falls in love with Judah, who is betrothed to Dovey, and realises first-hand what it is like to love somebody but not be able to have them. This helps Abigail to realise that she should not be selfish towards her parents and let them have a second chance at life and marriage. 

Abigail finally manages to return to her own time and discovers that her neighbours, Natalie and Vincent, are descendants of the Bow family. She also finds that Beatie will grow up to be a lady and well educated, and Judah will die at sea after marrying Dovey. After Abigail returns from Norway with her parents she meets Natalie and Vincent's uncle, who looks precisely the same as Judah. The two fall in love and Abigail tells him the story of how she went back in time.

Reviews
According to a review by a scholar of today, Playing Beatie Bow falls somewhere between a children's book and young-adult fiction.

Main characters
Abigail Kirk, formerly Lynette Kirk

Locations

The Bows' confectionery shop is located on the corner of Argyle Street and Cambridge Street, immediately to the east of the Argyle Cut, see maps at Wikimedia geohack.
The fictional high-rise tower "Mitchell", where the Kirks and the Crowns live, is located on George Street to the south of "The Suez Canal" (approximate location on map). In real life the only high-rise building in the Rocks is the Sirius building, located much further north. This was used for the film.
The Suez Canal, where Abigail was abducted, is located in between the Mitchell tower and the Cut (map). The name "Suez Canal" is said to have emerged as a pun on both "sewers", as the lane was one of the most disreputable places in the Rocks, and the Suez Canal in Egypt.

Adaptations
In 1986, the book was turned into a feature film also called Playing Beatie Bow. Made by the South Australian Film Corporation, it starred Imogen Annesley as Abigail, Peter Phelps as Judah Bow and Mouche Phillips as the title character Beatie Bow.

On 22 February — 1 May 2021, the Sydney Theatre Company performed a play based on the book, written by the leading Australian playwright Kate Mulvany and artistic director Kip Williams, the duo responsible for the multi-award-winning 2018 stage adaptation of Park's book The Harp in the South. It was sold out.

Awards
Won – CBCA Children's Book of the Year Award: Older Readers (1981)
Won – Parents' Choice Award for Literature, awarded by the Parents' Choice Foundation (1982)
Won – Boston Globe-Horn Book Award (1982)
Honour Diploma – International Board on Books for Young People (Australia) (1982)
Runner-up – Guardian Fiction Prize (UK) (1982)
Won – Canberra's Own Outstanding List: Fiction for Older Readers Award (1994)

References

External links
Article recalling a school trip to Argyle Street area where the book is set

1980 Australian novels
1980 children's books
Australian children's novels
CBCA Children's Book of the Year Award-winning works
Children's fantasy novels
COOL Award-winning works
Novels about time travel
Novels by Ruth Park
Novels set in Sydney